The 2009 AFF U-16 Women's Championship was held from 9 October to 18 October 2009, hosted by Myanmar. All games were played at the Thuwunna Stadium and Aung San Stadium. It was the first tournament held for this age bracket amongst the group of annual AFF Women's Championship events.

Tournament 
All times are Myanmar Standard Time – UTC+6:30.

Group stage

Group A

Group B

Knockout stage

Bracket

Semi-finals

Third place play-off

Final

Awards
Thailand won the fair-play award.

References

External links 
 AFF Women's Championship 2009 at AFF official website

women
2009 in women's association football
2009
2009 in Burmese football
2009–10 in Australian women's soccer
2009 in Thai football
2009 in Philippine football
2009 in Vietnamese football
2009 in Malaysian football
2009–10 in Indonesian football